Korab is a Polish coat of arms. It was used by many szlachta (noble) families under the Kingdom of Poland and the Polish–Lithuanian Commonwealth.

History

 Motto of the Korab coat of arms:  "Deo Gloria" ("Glory to God").
 First Mention: 1242 Zbislaw of Korab appointed Voivode of Sieradz
 Second Registry: 1292 from the Seal of Korab.
 Third Registry: 1480s - Revised.  "The golden Watchtower within the Ark of Noah was removed from the Seal of Korab and replaced with a Black Mast.
In 1983 the Polish Korab coat of arms was unusually incorporated into a grant of arms by the English College of Arms in London.  These new arms included the Ciołek Arms held by the Zelenski (Zileinski) clan which were used as the crest of the Armorial Bearings with the shield of the Korab remaining the same. The two families were united by marriage in 1977. This was an unusual grant of arms and said to have made heraldic history in England.

Notable bearers

Notable bearers of this coat of arms have included:

 Zbislaw of Sieradz
 Jakub Zadzik
 Jan Łaski (1456–1531), Primate of Poland
 Hieronymus Łaski
 Janisław I, Archbishop of Gniezno
 Jacques Hnizdovsky (1915-1985) — Ukrainian-American painter, printmaker, graphic designer, illustrator and sculptor
 Ludomił Rayski
 Em Krynicki (1987) Genderqueer/Transmasculine Blind Legal academic

See also
 Polish heraldry
 Heraldic family
 List of Polish nobility coats of arms

Bibliography
 Bartosz Paprocki: Herby rycerstwa polskiego na pięcioro ksiąg rozdzielone, Kraków, 1584.
 Tadeusz Gajl: Herbarz polski od średniowiecza do XX wieku : ponad 4500 herbów szlacheckich 37 tysięcy nazwisk 55 tysięcy rodów. L&L, 2007. .

Korab